The Joseph Allen Skinner Museum is a cabinet of curiosities collected by silk magnate Joseph Skinner throughout his life. The collection is housed in the former First Congregational Church of Prescott, Massachusetts, which was built in 1846 and moved to South Hadley by Skinner in 1930 during the creation of the Quabbin Reservoir. Skinner, a benefactor of the college, deeded the entire collection to Mount Holyoke College following his death in 1946. Today the museum is maintained by the college's art museum. With the emergence of the COVID-19 pandemic in 2020, the museum closed temporarily and reopened in 2022.

See also
 Wistariahurst, historical museum in the former Skinner family estate in Holyoke, Massachusetts

References

External links

 Official website, Mount Holyoke College
 Joseph Allen Skinner Museum, Atlas Obscura

Churches completed in 1846
History_museums_in_Massachusetts
Mount Holyoke College
Museums established in 1946
Museums in Hampshire County, Massachusetts
Relocated buildings and structures in Massachusetts
South Hadley, Massachusetts